WRWN (107.9 FM, "Rewind 107.9") is a classic hits radio station licensed to Port Royal, South Carolina and owned by Dick Broadcasting.

History
The station signed on at 107.1 FM. In June 1988, WLOW began playing nostalgia/big band on 106.9 FM, one of the few FM stations to play this style of music. For much of 1994 the station became the home of local talk station WHHR-FM "The News and Conversation Station". The station was costly to operate and a strong opposition was formed against the loss of the nostalgia format, which had found a home on 99.7 FM. WLOW returned to standards in December, 1994. In 1995, Adventure Radio purchased the station and upgraded it to a class C1 station. WLOW traded frequencies with WIJY at 107.9. Over the years the music evolved into adult standards with some smooth jazz at night. The standards format continued through late 2005 as "WLOW 107.9 - Good Times, Great Memories" until October 2005. After playing Christmas music during the 2005 holiday season,  WLOW rebranded itself and launched a new format, a more up-tempo Soft AC on the frequency as "Familiar Favorites - 107.9 The Coast". Although the new format was similar to the previous WLOW, it featured more recent material, from artists such as Frank Sinatra, The Bee Gees, The Beach Boys, Marvin Gaye, Gloria Estefan, and Fleetwood Mac. Smooth jazz was played at night.

After stunting with an all Irish music format as "Shamrock 107.9" on St. Patrick's Day, WLOW flipped from Soft AC to Hot AC as Y107.9 - "90's, 2K, & Today!" on March 18, 2011. The call letters were also changed to WXYY.

The new station was programmed by Brad Wells  and in less than two years on 107.9 raised thousands of dollars for Susan G. Komen For The Cure Coastal Georgia  and also collected over 4,000 for the area United States Marine Corps Toys for Tots Drive.

On March 14, 2014 WXYY's call letters and format were moved to the stronger 100.1 signal as "Y100". 107.9's call letters were changed to WRWN, which stunted again with an all-Irish music format as "Shamrock 107.9". The stunting ended March 18, 2014 when WRWN launched a classic hits format branded as "Rewind 107.9".

In September 2017, Dick Broadcasting announced the purchase of Alpha Media stations in three markets.

On November 1, 2022, WRWN switched to Christmas music as "Christmas 107.9" for the first time, before returning to the Classic Hits format on December 26th.

Previous logos

References

External links

Radio stations established in 1988
RWN
Alpha Media radio stations